What Does Anything Mean? Basically is the second studio album by English rock band the Chameleons. It was recorded in January 1985 and released on 20 May 1985 by record label Statik.

One single was released from the album: "Singing Rule Britannia (While the Walls Close In)".

Recording 
What Does Anything Mean? Basically was recorded in January 1985 at Highland Studios in Inverness, Scotland.

Release 
The album's sole single, "Singing Rule Britannia (While the Walls Close In)", was released on 1 August 1985. This song used uncredited Lennon-McCartney lyrics, with the final passage of the song quoting key lyrics of the Beatles song "She Said, She Said".

What Does Anything Mean? Basically was released 20 May 1985 on record label Statik.

Reception 

What Does Anything Mean? Basically has been generally well received by critics.

In his retrospective review, Ned Raggett of AllMusic called it "[a] rarity of sophomore albums, something that at once made the band all the more unique in its sound while avoiding a repetition of earlier work. [...]  an astounding record." Trouser Press called it "even better" than Script of the Bridge, "with much stronger production underscoring both the band's direct power and the ghostly atmospherics of its icy church keyboards and delay-ridden guitars".

Chris Jenkins, in the book The Rough Guide to Rock, however, called it "as half-baked as its title".

Track listing

Personnel 
 The Chameleons

 Mark Burgess – vocals, bass guitar, strings, production
 Dave Fielding – guitar, ARP String Ensemble, production
 Reg Smithies – guitar, acoustic guitar, album cover illustration, production
 John Lever – drums, production

 Technical

 Colin Richardson – production
 Ian Caple – engineering
 Martin Kay – sleeve design

References

External links 
 

1985 albums
The Chameleons albums
Albums produced by Colin Richardson